Alex Colin Kpakpé (born 22 February 2004) is an English professional footballer currently playing as a left-back for Rangers.

Club career
Born in Hackney, Kpakpé first took an interest at the age of five, playing in his garden with cousins Ryan and Steven Sessegnon. He played grassroots football in Tulse Hill, before joining the academy of Chelsea at under-14 level. During his youth, he also played handball, and was a 100 metres sprinter. Initially a defensive midfielder, Kpakpé transitioned to a left-back during his time with Chelsea. He signed his first professional contract in February 2021.

His time with the Blues was hampered by injury and illness, and after four years in West London, he left the club in November 2022. The following month, he played in a bounce match with Scottish side Rangers. He signed a six-month deal with Rangers in January 2023.

On 14 January 2023, he made his debut for Rangers B in the Lowland League, coming on as a substitute for Mackenzie Strachan in a 6–1 win over Dalbeattie Star.

Personal life
Kpakpé's cousins are Tottenham Hotspur winger Ryan Sessegnon and Fulham right-back Steven Sessegnon, respectfully; both of whom have represented England at youth international level.

He is of Ivorian descent.

Career statistics

Club

Notes

References

External links
 

2004 births
Living people
Footballers from the London Borough of Hackney
Footballers from Greater London
English people of Ivorian descent
English footballers
Association football defenders
Lowland Football League players
Chelsea F.C. players
Rangers F.C. players
Black British sportspeople